The 2022 Duke's Mayo Bowl was a college football bowl game played on December 30, 2022, at Bank of America Stadium in Charlotte, North Carolina. The 21st annual Duke's Mayo Bowl, the game featured the NC State Wolfpack from the Atlantic Coast Conference (ACC) and the Maryland Terrapins from the Big Ten Conference. The game began at 12:04 p.m. EST and was aired on ESPN. It was one of the 2022–23 bowl games concluding the 2022 FBS football season. The game's title sponsor was Duke's Mayonnaise.

Teams
This was the 21st edition of the game, though only the third under its current name; the bowl had gone by three other names since its inauguration in 2002. Consistent with conference tie-ins, the game featured the NC State Wolfpack from the Atlantic Coast Conference (ACC) and the Maryland Terrapins from the Big Ten Conference (B1G). This was the 71st meeting between NC State and Maryland, who spent 1953 to 2014 in the ACC together; entering the game, the all-time series was tied, 33–33–4. The teams last met in 2013, a contest also won by Maryland. This was NC State's 35th overall bowl game appearance and their fourth in this particular game, having competed in 2005, 2011, 2015. Maryland made their 29th overall bowl game appearance and their first in this particular game.

NC State Wolfpack

NC State finished their regular season with an overall 8–4 record, 4–4 in ACC games. After starting with four wins against non-conference opponents, the Wolfpack went 4-4 during Atlantic Coast Conference games for the rest of the season. The Wolfpack played four ranked teams, losing to Clemson, Syracuse, while defeating North Carolina and Wake Forest. They also defeated eventual No. 13 Florida State, although Florida State was not ranked at the time they played NC State.

Maryland Terrapins

Maryland finished their regular season with an overall 7–5 record, 4–5 in B1G games. After starting with three wins against non-conference opponents, the Terrapins went 4–5 during Big Ten Conference games for the rest of the season. The Terrapins played three ranked teams, losing to Michigan, Ohio State, and Penn State.

Game summary

Statistics

References

Duke's Mayo Bowl
Duke's Mayo Bowl
Duke's Mayo Bowl
Duke's Mayo Bowl
Maryland Terrapins football bowl games
NC State Wolfpack football bowl games